Carrickdexter Cross is a wayside cross and National Monument located in County Meath, Ireland.

Location

Description

This monument was erected by Jennet Dowdall and her husband Oliver Plunkett c. 1607. It is similar in appearance to other Dowdall crosses at Duleek and Gaulstown but has less sculpture and more inscription. There are heraldic shields on all four sides.

References

Archaeological sites in County Meath
National Monuments in County Meath